Vicarious may refer to:
 Vicariousness, experiencing through another person
 Vicarious learning, observational learning

In law
 Vicarious liability, a term in common law
 Vicarious liability (criminal), a term in criminal law

Religion
 Vicarious atonement, Christian doctrine
 Vicarious baptism, baptism for the dead

Science and technology
 Vicarious (company), an artificial intelligence company
 Vicarious Visions, a video game developer
 Vicarious problem-solving, a rational approach to economic theory
 Vicarious traumatization, transformation in the self of a trauma worker or helper that results from empathic  engagement with traumatized clients and their reports of traumatic experiences.

Entertainment
 "Vicarious," a song by Cadence Weapon from the album Breaking Kayfabe
 Vicarious (album), an album by New Zealand band Strawpeople
 Vicarious (song), a single by the progressive metal band Tool

See also
 Proxy (disambiguation)
 Surrogate (disambiguation)
 Passive (disambiguation)
 Avatar (disambiguation)